The Bagamoyo Port is set to be constructed in Bagamoyo, Tanzania. It is planned to be one of the largest government infrastructure projects in the country. The Bagamoyo port and its affiliate industrial zone is meant to address congestion at the old port and support Tanzania to become East Africa’s leading shipping and logistics centre.

History
Contracts to begin port construction were signed in October 2015 and was set to complete phase I of the construction project in 2017. The project was cancelled by a new government 3 months later in January 2016.

Plan
The port is set to handle 20 million teu by 2045 and will be the largest port in East Africa when completed.  The port is to handle 25 times the amount of cargo of Dar es Salaam Port and will help reduce the congestion at the port. The project also involves the construction of a Special economic zone adjacent to the port. Also to be constructed around Bagamoyo area are over 190 industries, including the manure processing industry that will be put up by the government of Oman. When fully developed, the Bagamoyo Special Economic Zone will attract about 700 industries to become a strategic investment zone in East Africa. The Chinese and Oman firms were supposed to invest in the project, but they dropped out. Other foreign companies have shown interest to invest in the project.

Special Economic Zone 
The project also includes a 1700 ha special industrial zone. The special economic zone is funded by the Government of Tanzania and the State government reserve fund from Oman. The port is being constructed by China and the industrial zone will be constructed by Oman and administered by Export Processing Zone Authority of Tanzania. The industrial zone will also have rail links to the TAZARA Railway and Tanzanian Central Railway.

Stalling since 2019
In 2019 the Tanzanian government under President Magufuli entered into new negotiations about the ratification of the project. He was reported to have called the conditions "exploitative". In May 2019 Tanzania Ports Authority's (TPA) director general Deusdedit Kakoko declared that the negotiations have stalled "because investors’ conditions were likely to deny Tanzania maximum benefit from the project", pointing to demands for tax exemption and compensation for any losses incurred during implementation of the project. In April 2020 a Kenyan newsite reported that Tanzania had cancelled the project, which was not commented on by official sources. Ever since the president had declared plans of reviving the project, many investors have shown interest. In September 2022, it was announced that the construction of the port will be commenced by the Government of Tanzania in 2023, and the investors will join in later.

See also 

Tanzania Ports Authority
Transport in Tanzania
China Merchants Port

References

External links 

Ports and harbours of Tanzania
Proposed transport infrastructure in Tanzania
Proposed ports